East Tākaka is a settlement in the Tasman District of New Zealand.

Located in the Tākaka valley, East Tākaka sits on the eastern side of the Tākaka River. The area developed from the 1860s, with an Anglican church built in 1868, the East Takaka School being established in 1874, and a post office—called Takaka East—opening in 1877. Sawmilling was an important industry in the early days, with large areas of native forest in the Tākaka valley being exploited. The sawn timber was taken to the coast and shipped throughout New Zealand, facilitated between 1882 and 1905 by the steam-powered Takaka Tramway that ran from East Tākaka to the wharf at Waitapu, at the mouth of the Tākaka River. Other activities in the area included sheep farming and hop growing.

East Takaka School closed in 1968, and the old building, given historic place category 2 status by Heritage New Zealand in 1990, is now used as the local community hall. East Takaka Church, described as "a fine example of the small Gothic Revival churches built in timber throughout New Zealand in the second half of [the nineteenth] century", was listed as a category 1 historic place by Heritage New Zealand in 1990.

References

Populated places in the Tasman District